The Quinnipiac Bobcats women's ice hockey represented Quinnipiac University in the 2009–10 NCAA Division I women's ice hockey season. The Bobcats were the most improved team in the NCAA. At season's end, the squad had won 19 contests, a 16 win improvement compared to the 2008–09 season, when Quinnipiac won only 3 games. The Bobcats set a school record with conference wins (11), and hosted a postseason game for the first time in the program's history.

Offseason
April 16: The Quinnipiac University women's ice hockey program has teamed up with the Holiday Inn in North Haven, Conn., to benefit the Ronald McDonald House.  The women's ice hockey team will also donate, prepare and cook a monthly meal for guests of the Ronald McDonald House and participate in its annual spring cleaning.

April 17: Quinnipiac University and USA Hockey today announced that the Qwest Tour, featuring the 2009–10 U.S. Women's National Team, will come to the TD Banknorth Sports Center on January 3, 2010 when Team USA plays the ECAC Hockey All-Stars at 2 p.m.
May 12: Junior assistant captain Kallie Flor (Farmington, Minn.) was named captain of the Quinnipiac University women's ice hockey team for the 2009–10 season at the Women's Ice Hockey Awards Banquet. Fellow junior Evelina Husar (Eskilstuna, Sweden) was appointed assistant captain for the second consecutive season. Junior Janine Duffy (Toronto, Ontario) was named the team's Most Valuable Player at the banquet, while senior Trudy Reyns (Port Hope, Ontario) was awarded the Defensive Player of the Year, and freshman Chelsea Illchuk (Lockhart, Manitoba) took home the Rookie of the Year accolade. Team trainer Jennifer Skelley was also recognized, earning the Coaches Award.
May 13: Nine members of the Quinnipiac University women's ice hockey team volunteered their time at the March of Dimes New Haven March for Babies walk on April 26. The march took place at Lighthouse Point Park in New Haven.

Regular season
The Bobcats will compete in the Nutmeg Classic.
Jan. 15–16: In the sweep of then No. 10 ranked Syracuse Orange women's ice hockey program, Kallie Flor scored back-to-back, game-winning goals. This included the first overtime game winner for Quinnipiac since November 29, 2006.
Feb. 19: With a 1–0 defeat of Yale, Victoria Vigilanit registered her fifth shutout of the year
Feb 20: Vigilanti allowed just one goal on 31 shots, as the Bobcats defeated Brown 8–1. Vigilanti would get her 17th victory and the 11th victory in the conference.
March 5: Bobcats head coach Rick Seeley was selected as ECAC Coach of the Year. Under his tutelage, the Bobcats had their most successful season to date. In their nine-year history, it was their best overall and best conference record.  The school had a 19–10–8 regular season record, while their conference mark was 11–4–7.
March 6: Freshman goalie Victoria Vigilanti was named ECAC Hockey Goaltender of the Year. She was the first Quinnipiac student-athlete to win the award. Of note, she appeared in all 22 conference games and posted a win–loss record of 11–4–7.

Schedule

Roster

Schedule

Player stats

Skaters

Postseason
 On February 28, Quinnipiac made NCAA history. Against the Rensselaer Engineers, the Bobcats lost by a score of 2–1, but it took five overtimes. It is now the longest college hockey game in NCAA history. Senior defenseman Laura Gersten had the game-winning goal. She registered it at 4:32 of the fifth overtime session to not only clinch the win, but the series victory. RPI advanced to the ECAC Hockey Women's Semifinals for the second consecutive season. The Engineers will face top ranked Cornell University.

Awards and honors
Heather Hughes, ECAC Rookie of the Week (Week of November 9)
Heather Hughes, ECAC All-Rookie Team
Rick Seeley, ECAC Coach of the Year
Rick Seeley, New England Hockey Writers All-Star Team (Coach)
Victoria Vigilanti, ECAC Defensive Player of the Week (Week of October 19)
Victoria Vigilanti, ECAC Defensive Player of the Week (Week of February 22)
Victoria Vigilanti, ECAC Leader, Save percentage (.957)
Victoria Vigilanti, Ranked second, Goals against average (1.15)
Victoria Vigilanti, ECAC All-Rookie Team
Victoria Vigilanti, All-ECAC First Team
Victoria Vigilanti, ECAC Goaltender of the Year
Victoria Vigilanti, New England Hockey Writers All-Star Team
Hughes and Vigilanti made school history. It marks the first time in women's hockey history at the school that two players both received postseason honours in the same year. In addition, it marked the first time since the 2006–07 season that a player from the Bobcats received a postseason honour.

Team Awards
Kallie Flor, 2010 Most Valuable Player
Kelsey Britton, 2010 Coaches Award
Jordan Elkins, 2010 Top Defensive Player
Victoria Vigilanti, 2010 Rookie of the Year

References

External links
 Official site

Quinnipiac
Quinnipiac Bobcats women's ice hockey seasons